George Rudman (born February 22, 1968) is a retired American soccer player.

Rudman was born in Chicago, Illinois, and played as a forward for the Chicago Croatian soccer club. George played in the CONCACAF Champions Cup in 1985. The games were played in San Pedro Sula and Tegucigalpa, Honduras, Central America.

References

American soccer players
1968 births
Living people
Association footballers not categorized by position